Calpocalyx brevifolius is a species of flowering plant in the family Fabaceae. It is found only in Gabon.

References

Mimosoids
Endemic flora of Gabon
Vulnerable flora of Africa
Taxonomy articles created by Polbot